Thomas Percival Lancaster (July 18, 1877 – October 10, 1968) was a newspaper publisher and political figure in Ontario. He represented the ridings of  Peterborough County and Peterborough in the Legislative Assembly of Ontario from 1929 to 1937 as a Conservative member.

Lancaster purchased the Havelock Standard in 1897 and operated it until 1939. He died in Campbellford at the age of 91.

References

External links

1968 deaths
1877 births
Canadian newspaper publishers (people)
Progressive Conservative Party of Ontario MPPs